Cyril William Bacon (9 November 1919 – 26 March 2001) was an English professional footballer who played as a wing half for Leyton Orient, making 118 appearances in the Football League. 

Bacon joined Orient in June 1946 and made his league debut against Southend United in the following September. He made 121 league and cup appearances for Orient, scoring three goals, in four seasons before being released in May 1950.

References

1919 births
2001 deaths
Footballers from Hammersmith
English footballers
Association football wing halves
Hayes F.C. players
Leyton Orient F.C. players
Brentford F.C. players
English Football League players
British expatriates in the United States